Jonathan Flint may refer to 

 Jon Flint born 1951, venture capitalist
 Jonathan Flint (scientist)  Professor in Residence in the Department of Psychiatry and Biobehavioral Sciences at the David Geffen School of Medicine at UCLA

See also
 John Flint (disambiguation)